Presentation of Christ in the Temple is a painting of the Presentation of Christ in the Temple by Simon Vouet, executed c. 1640–1641, commissioned from him by cardinal Richelieu for the Jesuit church of Saint-Paul-Saint-Louis. The main painting is now in the Louvre, whilst its original upper panel The Apotheosis of St Louis is now in the Musée des beaux-arts de Rouen.

Sources
http://cartelfr.louvre.fr/cartelfr/visite?srv=car_not_frame&idNotice=1132

1641 paintings
Paintings by Simon Vouet
Paintings in the collection of the Museum of Fine Arts of Lyon
Angels in art
Vouet